In computer science, a Cartesian tree is a binary tree derived from a sequence of numbers. The smallest number in the sequence is at the root of the tree; its left and right subtrees are constructed recursively from the subsequences to the left and right of this number. When all numbers are distinct, the Cartesian tree is uniquely defined from the properties that it is heap-ordered and that a symmetric (in-order) traversal of the tree returns the original sequence.

A Cartesian tree for a sequence may be constructed in linear time.

Definition
The Cartesian tree for a sequence of numbers is defined by the following properties:
The Cartesian tree for a sequence has one node for each number in the sequence. Each node is associated with a single sequence value.
A symmetric (in-order) traversal of the tree results in the original sequence. That is, the left subtree consists of the values earlier than the root in the sequence order, while the right subtree consists of the values later than the root, and a similar ordering constraint holds at each lower node of the tree.
The tree has the heap property: the parent of any non-root node has a smaller value than the node itself.
Based on the heap property, the root of the tree must be the smallest number in the sequence. From this, the tree itself may also be defined recursively: the root is the minimum value of the sequence, and the left and right subtrees are the Cartesian trees for the subsequences to the left and right of the root value.

For a sequence of distinct numbers, the three properties above determine a unique Cartesian tree. If a sequence of numbers contains repetitions, the Cartesian tree may be determined by following a consistent tie-breaking rule before applying the above construction. For instance, the first of two equal elements may be treated as the smaller of the two.

Efficient construction
A Cartesian tree may be constructed in linear time from its input sequence.
One method is to simply process the sequence values in left-to-right order, maintaining the Cartesian tree of the nodes processed so far, in a structure that allows both upwards and downwards traversal of the tree. The total time for this procedure is linear, because the time spent searching for the parent  of each new node  can be charged against the number of nodes that are removed from the rightmost path in the tree.

An alternative linear-time construction algorithm is based on the all nearest smaller values problem. The right neighbor is defined symmetrically. The sequence of left neighbors may be found by an algorithm that maintains a stack containing a subsequence of the input. The right neighbors may be found by applying the same stack algorithm to the reverse of the sequence. The left and right neighbors may also be constructed efficiently by parallel algorithms, so this formulation may be used to develop efficient parallel algorithms for Cartesian tree construction.

Another linear-time algorithm for Cartesian tree construction is based on divide-and-conquer. The algorithm recursively constructs the tree on each half of the input, and then merges the two trees by taking the right spine of the left tree and left spine of the right tree (both of which are paths whose root-to-leaf order sorts their values from smallest to largest) and performs a standard merging operation, replacing these two paths in two trees by a single path that contains the same nodes. In the merged path, the successor in the sorted order of each node from the left tree is placed in its right child, and the successor of each node from the right tree is placed in its left child, the same position that was previously used for its successor in the spine. The left children of nodes from the left tree and right children of nodes from the right tree are left unchanged. The algorithm is also parallelizable since on each level of recursion, each of the two sub-problems can be computed in parallel, and the merging operation can be efficiently parallelized as well.

It is possible to maintain the Cartesian tree of a dynamic input, subject to insertions of elements and lazy deletion of elements, in logarithmic amortized time per operation. Here, lazy deletion means that up to a constant fraction of the elements in the current tree may be marked as deleted, rather than actually removed. When too large a fraction of elements are marked, the tree is rebuilt.

Applications

Range searching and lowest common ancestors

Cartesian trees may be used as part of an efficient data structure for range minimum queries, a range searching problem involving queries that ask for the minimum value in a contiguous subsequence of the original sequence. In a Cartesian tree, this minimum value may be found at the lowest common ancestor of the leftmost and rightmost values in the subsequence. For instance, in the subsequence (12,10,20,15) of the sequence shown in the first illustration, the minimum value of the subsequence (10) forms the lowest common ancestor of the leftmost and rightmost values (12 and 15). Because lowest common ancestors may be found in constant time per query, using a data structure that takes linear space to store and that may be constructed in linear time, the same bounds hold for the range minimization problem.

 reversed this relationship between the two data structure problems by showing that data structures for range minimization could also be used for finding lowest common ancestors. Their data structure associates with each node of the tree its distance from the root, and constructs a sequence of these distances in the order of an Euler tour of the (edge-doubled) tree. It then constructs a range minimization data structure for the resulting sequence. The lowest common ancestor of any two vertices in the given tree can be found as the minimum distance appearing in the interval between the initial positions of these two vertices in the sequence. Bender and Farach-Colton also provide a method for range minimization that can be used for the sequences resulting from this transformation, which have the special property that adjacent sequence values differ by ±1. As they describe, for range minimization in sequences that do not have this form, it is possible to use Cartesian trees to reduce the range minimization problem to lowest common ancestors, and then to use Euler tours to reduce lowest common ancestors to a range minimization problem with this special form.

The same range minimization problem may also be given an alternative interpretation in terms of two dimensional range searching. A collection of finitely many points in the Cartesian plane may be used to form a Cartesian tree, by sorting the points by their -coordinates and using the -coordinates in this order as the sequence of values from which this tree is formed. In this way, after the leftmost and rightmost points in the slab are identified, all points within the three-sided region may be listed in constant time per point.

The same construction, of lowest common ancestors in a Cartesian tree, makes it possible to construct a data structure with linear space that allows the distances between pairs of points in any ultrametric space to be queried in constant time per query. The distance within an ultrametric is the same as the minimax path weight in the minimum spanning tree of the metric. From the minimum spanning tree, one can construct a Cartesian tree, the root node of which represents the heaviest edge of the minimum spanning tree. Removing this edge partitions the minimum spanning tree into two subtrees, and Cartesian trees recursively constructed for these two subtrees form the children of the root node of the Cartesian tree. The leaves of the Cartesian tree represent points of the metric space, and the lowest common ancestor of two leaves in the Cartesian tree is the heaviest edge between those two points in the minimum spanning tree, which has weight equal to the distance between the two points. Once the minimum spanning tree has been found and its edge weights sorted, the Cartesian tree may be constructed in linear time.

As a binary search tree

Because a Cartesian tree is a binary tree, it is natural to use it as a binary search tree for an ordered sequence of values. However, defining a Cartesian tree based on the same values that form the search keys of a binary search tree does not work well: the Cartesian tree of a sorted sequence is just a path, rooted at its leftmost endpoint, and binary searching in this tree degenerates to sequential search in the path. However, it is possible to generate more-balanced search trees by generating priority values for each search key that are different than the key itself, sorting the inputs by their key values, and using the corresponding sequence of priorities to generate a Cartesian tree. This construction may equivalently be viewed in the geometric framework described above, in which the -coordinates of a set of points are the search keys and the -coordinates are the priorities.

The data structure resulting from this random choice is called a treap, due to its combination of binary search tree and binary heap features. An insertion into a treap may be performed by inserting the new key as a leaf of an existing tree, choosing a priority for it, and then performing tree rotation operations along a path from the node to the root of the tree to repair any violations of the heap property caused by this insertion; a deletion may similarly be performed by a constant amount of change to the tree followed by a sequence of rotations along a single path in the tree. A variation on this data structure called a zip tree uses the same idea of random priorities, but simplifies the random generation of the priorities, and performs insertions and deletions in a different way, by splitting the sequence and its associated Cartesian tree into two subsequences and two trees and then recombining them.

If the priorities of each key are chosen randomly and independently once whenever the key is inserted into the tree, the resulting Cartesian tree will have the same properties as a random binary search tree, a tree computed by inserting the keys in a randomly chosen permutation starting from an empty tree, with each insertion leaving the previous tree structure unchanged and inserting the new node as a leaf of the tree. Random binary search trees had been studied for much longer, and are known to behave well as search trees (they have logarithmic depth with high probability); the same good behavior carries over to treaps. It is also possible, as suggested by Aragon and Seidel, to reprioritize frequently-accessed nodes, causing them to move towards the root of the treap and speeding up future accesses for the same keys.

In sorting

 describe a sorting algorithm based on Cartesian trees. They describe the algorithm as based on a tree with the maximum at the root, but it may be modified straightforwardly to support a Cartesian tree with the convention that the minimum value is at the root. For consistency, it is this modified version of the algorithm that is described below.

The Levcopoulos–Petersson algorithm can be viewed as a version of selection sort or heap sort that maintains a priority queue of candidate minima, and that at each step finds and removes the minimum value in this queue, moving this value to the end of an output sequence. In their algorithm, the priority queue consists only of elements whose parent in the Cartesian tree has already been found and removed. Thus, the algorithm consists of the following steps:
 Construct a Cartesian tree for the input sequence
 Initialize a priority queue, initially containing only the tree root
 While the priority queue is non-empty:
 Find and remove the minimum value in the priority queue
 Add this value to the output sequence
 Add the Cartesian tree children of the removed value to the priority queue

As Levcopoulos and Petersson show, for input sequences that are already nearly sorted, the size of the priority queue will remain small, allowing this method to take advantage of the nearly-sorted input and run more quickly. They also prove a lower bound stating that, for any  and (non-constant) , any comparison-based sorting algorithm must use  comparisons for some inputs.

In pattern matching
The problem of Cartesian tree matching has been defined as a generalized form of string matching in which one seeks a substring (or in some cases, a subsequence) of a given string that has a Cartesian tree of the same form as a given pattern. Fast algorithms for variations of the problem with a single pattern or multiple patterns have been developed, as well as data structures analogous to the suffix tree and other text indexing structures.

History
The name is derived from the Cartesian coordinate system for the plane: in one version of this structure, as in the two-dimensional range searching application discussed above, a Cartesian tree for a point set has the sorted order of the points by their -coordinates as its symmetric traversal order, and it has the heap property according to the -coordinates of the points.  described both this geometric version of the structure, and the definition here in which a Cartesian tree is defined from a sequence. Using sequences instead of point coordinates provides a more general setting that allows the Cartesian tree to be applied to non-geometric problems as well.

Notes

References

Binary trees
Sorting algorithms